The Roman Catholic Diocese of Pingliang is a diocese located in the city of Pingliang (Gansu) in the Ecclesiastical province of Lanzhou in China.

History
 January 25, 1930: Established as Apostolic Prefecture of Pingliang 平涼 from the Apostolic Vicariate of Qinzhou 秦州
 June 24, 1950: Promoted as Diocese of Pingliang 平涼

Leadership
Bishops of Pingliang 平涼 (Roman rite):
 Coadjutor Bishop Anthony Li Hui (2021-present) 
 Bishop Nicholas Han Jide (1991–present) 
 Bishop Philippe Ma Ji (1987 - 1999)
 Bishop Ignacio Gregorio Larrañaga Lasa, O.F.M. Cap. (June 25, 1950 – February 18, 1975)

References

 GCatholic.org
 Catholic Hierarchy

Roman Catholic dioceses in China
Christian organizations established in 1930
Roman Catholic dioceses and prelatures established in the 20th century
Religion in Gansu
Pingliang